Audun Heimdal (8 February 1997 – 20 August 2022) was a Norwegian orienteering and ski orienteering competitor.

Heimdal won a silver medal in the middle distance at the 2019 World Ski Orienteering Championships. He also won a gold medal in pursuit and a silver medal in sprint at the 2021 World Ski Orienteering Championships. Competing at the 2021 World Orienteering Championships, he won a silver medal in the mixed sprint relay, along with Victoria Hæstad Bjørnstad, Kasper Fosser and Andrine Benjaminsen.

Heimdal was diagnosed with cancer in 2022 and died on 20 August, at the age of 25.

References

External links
 

1997 births
2022 deaths
20th-century Norwegian people
21st-century Norwegian people
Norwegian orienteers
Ski-orienteers
Universiade silver medalists for Norway
Universiade bronze medalists for Norway
Competitors at the 2019 Winter Universiade
Deaths from cancer in Norway
Deaths from stomach cancer
Junior World Orienteering Championships medalists